Die Neue – Eine Frau mit Kaliber is a German television series.

See also
List of German television series

External links
 

1998 Austrian television series debuts
1998 Austrian television series endings
1998 German television series debuts
1999 German television series endings
1990s Austrian television series
Austrian crime television series
German crime television series
1990s German police procedural television series
German-language television shows
Sat.1 original programming
ORF (broadcaster)